Max Seeck (born 1985 in Helsinki) is a Finnish writer, film producer, screenwriter and film director.

By 2021, Seeck's detective stories had been translated into 40 languages.

Career 
Seeck graduated from Deutsche Schule Helsinki, studied economics at Tallinn majoring in finance and marketing. He worked at Danske Bank. After graduating with a Bachelor of Business Administration he and his fellow students founded a marketing company called Off Road Promotion & Management (now OFRD) and acted as its CEO. The company's first customer was AirBaltic. While working as an entrepreneur he completed a Master of Business Administration in Zürich.

Seeck began his first novel while on holiday in Croatia in 2013. On a day trip to Mostar he saw traces of the war in the buildings and war veterans in Bosnia and Herzegovina, aged around 40, with one arm or leg missing. After googling about the war of the breakup of Yugoslavia, he began to see the plot of a thriller featuring a Finnish professional soldier, Daniel Kuisma. Seeck left the company he had founded and started working as an independent consultant. He wrote the book alongside his main job for three years, encouraged by his family friend, journalist-writer Maarit Huovinen, among others. Seeck's debut thriller The Angels of Hammurabi was published by Tammi in early autumn 2016. The book is the first part of a trilogy on the war of the breakup of Yugoslavia. When the book was published, literary agent Elina Ahlbäck contacted Seeck and began selling the book abroad. The translation rights to the book were sold that autumn to for example Germany, and Estonia.

Mephisto Touch was published in the autumn of 2017, with publishing rights to Seeck's books sold to Italy, Germany, Iceland and Estonia. In 2018 and 2019, Seeck was also a film producer on two Finnish comedies.

Seeck's fourth book, The Witch Hunter, was published in early autumn 2019. In two months, the publishing rights to it were sold to 35 countries. In the United States, it is published by Berkley, Penguin Random House. The book is set in wintry Finland. Seeck's agent had told him that foreign publishers were interested in cold and dark Finland, serial killers and female protagonists. Also, due to the wishes of publishers, the books about Jessica Niemi do not move from country to country, as in Seeck's first series of books. In December, the filming rights for the book were sold to Hollywood-based Stampede Ventures, and filming for the television series The Witch Hunter was said to begin in 2022. The 12-part series will be produced by Gudrun Giddings. The contract was negotiated by Elina Ahlbäck, who has an office not only in Finland but also in Los Angeles. The last time a Finnish author's work was filmed in the US was in 1954, when Mika Waltari's The Egyptian was made into a movie.

By 2020, Seeck had left his day job at his company, but served in various positions of trust and on the boards of various companies. The Ice Coven was published in September. Its translation rights were sold to 23 language territories in two months. In November, The Witch Hunter made The New York Times bestseller list as the first Finnish book since The Egyptian. The novel was ranked 11th on the list. The book was also the book of the month in the thriller category of Barnes & Noble, the largest US bookstore chain.

By February 2021, translation rights to Seeck's books had been sold to more than forty countries, including the United States and almost all of Europe. Seeck's sixth book, Bad Blood, was published in the autumn. In September, it was announced that Seeck would direct the horror film with his childhood friend, communications entrepreneur Joonas Pajunen, with whom he had also co-written the screenplay. Solar Films' The Knocking will star Pekka Strang, Inka Kallén and Saana Koivisto, and will premiere in 2022. The film is about three siblings who try to sell the house where their parents were murdered years earlier. The film is produced by Markus Selin and Jukka Helle. Seeck had previously made music videos and co-produced films.

Style and working method 
Seeck's books have been described as Nordic noir, mystery detective stories and police novels, with mystical elements and strong character descriptions. As of 2021, he had contracts with 40 publishing houses.

Seeck publishes a book a year. He spends half a year writing, producing about three pages of text a day. The rest of the time he spends on marketing and other work on his books.

In his books, he draws on his own experiences, dreams, feelings and conversations. Even as he writes, he imagines what the book would look like as a film. In his books, he prefers short chapters that give the text a sense of momentum.

Seeck's literary influences include Dan Brown, Lars Kepler, Jo Nesbø, Paul Auster, George Orwell, Stieg Larsson and Jens Lapidus.

Awards and recognitions 

 The Finnish Crime Fiction Association selected The Angels of Hammurabi as Best Debut of the Year in 2017
 Storytel Awards 2019 Audiobook of the Year (Suspense and Detective Fiction) for The Witch Hunter
 Animus Awards 2020 Best Debut, Animus (Hungary) for The Witch Hunter

Personal life 
Seeck lives in Espoo with his wife and two children. His mother is artist Riitta Nelimarkka-Seeck, daughter of Neles' founder Antti Nelimarkka and granddaughter of painter Eero Nelimarkka. Seeck's father Jaakko Seeck is a businessman and an entrepreneur and of German descent. Seeck ancestors include A. O. Seeck, whose sausage and meat canning factory and store began operating in Helsinki in 1878.

Bibliography

Daniel Kuisma series 
 Hammurabin enkelit (The Angels of Hammurabi). Helsinki: Tammi, 2016. ISBN 978-951-31-9012-5
 Mefiston kosketus (The Mephisto Touch). Helsinki: Tammi, 2017. ISBN 978-951-31-9641-7
 Haadeksen kutsu (The Call of Hades). Helsinki: Tammi, 2018. ISBN 978-952-04-0154-2

Jessica Niemi series 
 Uskollinen lukija (The Witch Hunter). Helsinki: Tammi, 2019. ISBN 978-952-04-0814-5
 Pahan verkko (The Ice Coven). Helsinki: Tammi, 2020. ISBN 978-952-04-1789-5
 Kauna (Bad Blood). Helsinki: Tammi, 2021. ISBN 978-952-04-3146-4
 Loukko (The Archipelago). Helsinki: Tammi, 2022. ISBN 978-952-04-4319-1

Filmography

Movies 

 One of the producers of Swingers (2018)
 One of the producers of Täydellinen joulu (The Perfect Christmas) (2019)
 Knocking horror film (2022), writer and director

Television 

 Seeck appeared on the Finnish MasterChef VIP programme in 2021.

References 

Crime fiction writers
Finnish crime writers
Finnish crime fiction writers
Finnish directors
Finnish screenwriters
Living people
1985 births
Finnish writers